Samoa national basketball team is the team that represents Samoa in international basketball and is a member of FIBA Oceania.

Competitive record

FIBA Asia Cup 
never participated

FIBA Oceania Championships

Pacific Games

 1983: 
 1987-1995: ?
 1999: 
 2003: 
 2007: 
 2011: 6th
 2015: 5th
 2019: 6th
 2023: To be determined

Commonwealth Games

never participated

FIBA Polynesian Basketball Cup
 2018: 
 2021: Qualified as host

Current roster
At the 2019 Pacific Games:

|}

| valign="top" |

Head coach

Assistant coaches

Legend

Club – describes lastclub before the tournament
Age – describes ageon 6 July 2019

|}

Depth chart

Kit

Manufacturer
2018: EveniSport
2018-19: Zkeaps

See also
Samoa women's national basketball team
Samoa national under-19 basketball team
Samoa national under-17 basketball team
Samoa national 3x3 team

External links
Samoa Basketball Federation - facebook presentation
Samoa National Team at australiabasket.com

References

Videos
Samoa v Tonga - Full Game - FIBA Polynesian Basketball Cup 2018 Youtube.com video

Men's national basketball teams
Basketball